Thanks for Listening is a 1937 American comedy film directed by Marshall Neilan and written by Joseph O'Donnell and Stanley Roberts. The film stars Pinky Tomlin, Maxine Doyle, Aileen Pringle, Claire Rochelle, Henry Roquemore, Rafael Alcayde and Beryl Wallace. The film was released on July 12, 1937, by Ambassador Pictures.

Plot

Cast          
Pinky Tomlin as Homer Tompkins
Maxine Doyle as Toots
Aileen Pringle as Lulu Broderick
Claire Rochelle as Trixie Broderick
Henry Roquemore as Peter
Rafael Alcayde as Maurice
Beryl Wallace as Gloria Bagley
George Lloyd as Champ
Gwen Brian as Irene
Betty Brian as Mary
Doris Brian as Sally
Eliot Jones as Gabriel

References

External links
 

1937 films
1930s English-language films
American comedy films
1937 comedy films
Films directed by Marshall Neilan
American black-and-white films
1930s American films